Valentino Bucchi (29 November 1916 – 8 May 1976) was an Italian composer.

Biography
Bucchi was born in Florence, Italy, the son of musicians. He studied at Luigi Cherubini Conservatory of Music in Florence. He died in Rome, Italy.

Works

Theatrical works

Il Giuoco del Barone, opera in one act (1937)
Li Gieus de Robin et Marion (1953)
Il Contrabbasso, grottesco in one act (1954)
Una notte in paradiso, cantafavola in one act (1959-1960)
Il Coccodrillo, opera in 4 acts (1969-1970)

Chamber music

Sonatina for piano (1938)
Sonatina for harp (1944)
Racconto siciliano for two pianos (1955)
String quartet (1956)
Concerto for solo clarinet (1969) https://www.youtube.com/watch?v=5LhymfHEm-8&t=13s
Soliloquios, Monodrama for solo viola (1976)

Vocal music

Quattro liriche for voice and piano (1935-1940)
Cinque madrigali la dolce pena for voice and chamber orchestra (1946)
Cori della pietà morta for mixed choir and orchestra (1949-1950)
Due filastrocche for children's choir (1958-1959)
Colloquio Corale for solo voice, narrator, mixed choir and orchestra (1972)
Silence for mixed choir a cappella (1972)
Vocalizzo nel mondo dei fiori for solo voice and 10 instruments (1975)

Orchestral works

Ballata del silenzio for orchestra (1951)
Concerto in rondò for piano and orchestra (1957)
Concerto lirico for violin and strings (1958)
Banditi a Orgosolo, suite for orchestra from the music for the film of Vittorio De Seta (1965)
Suite for orchestra (1973)
Piccolo concerto per piccolo and strings (1973)
Concerto di concerti for string orchestra with violin, viola, cello and contrabass obligati (1974)
 Laudes Evangelii, choreographed by Léonide Massine, filmed by Joan Kemp-Welch (1961).

References
This article incorporates translated text from Valentino Bucchi at the Italian Wikipedia.

External links
The Valentino Bucchi Foundation (in Italian)
Biography (in English and Italian)

1916 births
1976 deaths
20th-century classical composers
Italian classical composers
Italian male classical composers
Italian opera composers
Male opera composers
Nastro d'Argento winners
Musicians from Florence
20th-century Italian composers
20th-century Italian male musicians